Established in 1949, the Graduate School of Korea University in Seoul, South Korea offers 45 doctoral and 47 master's programs.

History
In 1949, Hyun Sang-Yun, the first president, initiated an expansion of the campus by purchasing forest and land, and in September of the same year, the graduate school was established.

Facts
 Value of scholarships and ratio of recipients - KRW 18.7 billion, 89.1% of international students (as of 2008)
 Lecture in English - 34% of all lectures (as of 1st semester 2009)
 Number of non-Korean students - 277 (including 188 for Master's level, 74 for Ph.D. level, and 15 for integrated programs)

Academics
 Law
 Business Administration
 International Business
 English Language and Literature
 German Language and Literature
 French Language and Literature
 Chinese & Japanese Language and Literature
 Russian Language and Literature
 Spanish Language and Literature
 Philosophy
 History
 Korean History
 Linguistics
 Psychology
 Sociology  
 Comparative Literature and Culture (Interdisciplinary Program)
 Visual Culture (Interdisciplinary Program)
 Classics Translation (Interdisciplinary Program)
 Cultural Heritage Studies (Interdisciplinary Program) 
 Food and Resource Economics
 Environmental Science and Ecological Engineering
 Biotechnology   
 Political Science and International Relations
 Public Administration
 Economics
 Statistics 
 Financial Engineering (Interdisciplinary Program)
 Journalism and Mass Communication
 Mathematics
 Physics
 Chemistry
 Earth and Environmental Sciences 
 Science & Technology Studies (Interdisciplinary Program)
 Civil, Environmental and Architectural Engineering
 Architecture
 Mechanical Engineering
 Electrical Engineering
 Materials Science and Engineering
 Industrial Management Engineering
 Mechatronics (Interdisciplinary Program)
 Micro Device Engineering (Interdisciplinary Program)
 Micro/Nano Systems (Interdisciplinary Program)
 Telecommunication System Technology (Interdisciplinary Program)
 Biomicrosystem Engineering (Interdisciplinary Program)
 Medicine
 Biotechnology & Science  
 Public Health (Interdisciplinary Program)
 Biostatistics (Interdisciplinary Program)
 Nursing
 Health Science
 Education
 Curriculum and Instruction
 Home Economics
 Korean Language Education
 Physical Education
 Computer Information and Computer Science Education
 English Language Education 
 Geography  
 Computer and Radio Communications Engineering
 Brain and Cognitive Engineering 
 Visual Information Processing (Interdisciplinary Program)
 Bioinformatics (Interdisciplinary Program) 
 Social Welfare
 North Korean Studies
 Creative Writing
 Archaeology and Art History 
 Applied Linguistics and Culture Studies (Interdisciplinary Program) 
 Computer and Information Science
 Applied Physics
 Material Chemistry
 Informational Statistics
 Electronics and Information Engineering
 Environmental Engineering
 Control and Instrumentation Engineering
 Biotechnology and Bioinformatics
 Food Biotechnology
 Sport and Leisure Studies 
 Advanced Mechatronic Converging Technology (Interdisciplinary Program)  
 Economics and Statistics (Interdisciplinary Program)
 Digital Management
 Center for Advanced Mobile Solutions (Contract Program)
 Nano Semiconductor Engineering (Contract Program)

Housing
Students are responsible for arranging their own accommodations. The University dormitory is one option and also quite affordable, but availability is limited.
 CJ International House
 Anam Hall 2

References

External links
 

Korea University schools